Enemy Unseen is a Star Trek: The Original Series novel written by V.E. Mitchell.

The novel was originally set before "Where No Man Has Gone Before", but had to be rewritten at a late stage to be set after Star Trek: The Motion Picture, due to Paramount insisting that the Deltans were not part of the United Federation of Planets in that era.

Plot
The Enterprise is assigned to carry a diplomatic mission, which is nothing new. Things start to go really wrong for this one. The Federation ambassador is an old 'flame' of Kirk's, who aggressively tries to rekindle their old romance. Another diplomat presents Kirk with three of his wives, a situation with which he is not comfortable. Things take a turn for the worse when another diplomat is found killed.

References

External links

Novels based on Star Trek: The Original Series
1990 American novels
American science fiction novels